Opoa is a village on the island of Raiatea, in French Polynesia. According to the 2017 census, it had a population of 1,183 people.

Geography

Climate
Opoa has a tropical rainforest climate (Köppen climate classification Af).

References

Raiatea
Populated places in the Society Islands